Göran Printz-Påhlson (1931–2006) was a Swedish poet essayist, translator and literary critic. Among his essay collections are Solen i spegeln from 1958 and Appendiks from 1960. He was awarded the Dobloug Prize in 1992.  He held academic posts at Cambridge University, Harvard University, and elsewhere.

References

1931 births
2006 deaths
Swedish male poets
Swedish essayists
Swedish translators
Swedish literary critics
Dobloug Prize winners
20th-century Swedish poets
20th-century translators
Male essayists
20th-century essayists
20th-century Swedish male writers